Arzni (Russian: Арзни), is a resort village in the Kotayk Province of Armenia located on in the Hrazdan canyon. Modern village was founded on the place of old Armenian village called Arzni and mentioned by Movses Khorenatsi during the 19th century by Assyrian Christians who migrated to Eastern Armenia from Iran. The village is predominantly inhabited by Assyrians.

Gallery

See also 
Kotayk Province

References 

World Gazeteer: Armenia – World-Gazetteer.com

Populated places in Kotayk Province
Assyrian settlements
Assyrians in Armenia
Mountain resorts in Armenia
Yazidi populated places in Armenia